Mucherla Aruna is an Indian actress who worked in Telugu, Tamil, Malayalam and Kannada films, mainly during the 1980s.

Early life and career
Mucherla Aruna was born in Kothagudem of Telangana into a family that belongs to Arjunudupalem, near Tanuku West Godavari district of Andhra Pradesh. She was brought up in Chennai and Hyderabad.

Aruna made her debut in the Tamil film titled Kallukkul Eeram by Bharathiraja which was released in 1980. She has been frequently paired with actor Vijayakanth in Sivappu Malli, Needhi Pizhaithathu, Sattam Sirikkiradhu, and Kanalukku Karaiyethu with Shankar . In some of the Tamil movies, she appeared as the second lead and supporting roles. She acted as Poornima Bhagyaraj's friend in Darling, Darling, Darling and as Sudhakar's sister in Pennin Vazhkai. She acted with Karthik in suspense movie Kelviyum Naane Pathilum Naane which was released in 1982 where actress Srividya acted as an antagonist. Aruna Mucherla also acted in some good family-oriented movies like Kathula Poo, Sakalakala Sambanthi, and Penmani Aval Kanmani.

In 1981, the Telugu film Seethakoka Chiluka received a Swarna (Gold) Nandi Award for Best Feature Film. She spread across acting more than 70 movies within 10 years majoring all 4 South Indian languages. 

She is married to Mohan, a businessman based from Chandigarh in 1987 and the couple has four daughters. She lives in Chennai with her family.

Filmography
In order of languages in which she acted the most to fewest films.

Telugu

 Rao Gari Intlo Rowdy (1990)
 Athaku Yamudu Ammayiki Mogudu (1989)
 Geethanjali (1989)
 Swarnakamalam (1988)
 Yuddha Bhoomi (1988)
 Samsaram Oka Chadarangam (1987)
 Shrutilayalu (1987)
 Shrimati Oka Bahumati (1987)
 Makutamleni Maharaju (1987)
 Dongallo Dora (1987)
 Bhargava Ramudu (1987)
 Bhanumati Gari Mogudu (1987)
 Bharatamlo Arjunudu (1987)
 Deshoddharakudu (1986)
 Neti Yuga Dharmam (1986)
 Chantabbai (1986)
 Aruna Kiranam (1986)
 Mudilla Muchata (1985)
 Aagraham (1985)
 Assadhyudu (1985)
 Patala Nagu (1985)
 Sravanthi (1985)
 Swathi (1985)
 Bobbili Brahmanna (1984)
 Mugguru Ammayila Mogudu (1984)
 Srivariki Premalekha (1984)
 Raraju (1984)
 Seethamma Pelli (1984)
 Rama Rao Gopal Rao (1984)
 Puttadi Bomma (1983)
 Aalaya Sikharam (1983)
 Adavi Simhalu (1983)
 Poola Pallki (1982)
 Justice Chowdary (1982)
 Jegantalu (1981)
 Seetakoka Chiluka (1981)

Tamil

 Kallukkul Eeram (1980) – Debut in Tamil 
 Magarandham (1981)
 Sivappu Malli (1981)
 Needhi Pizhaithathu (1981)
 Pennin Vazhkai (1981)
 Nadodi Raja (1982)
 Anandha Ragam (1982)
 Sattam Sirikkiradhu (1982)
 Darling, Darling, Darling (1982)
 Nandri, Meendum Varuga (1982)
 Kelviyum Naane Pathilum Naane (1982) 
 Kanalukku Karaiyethu (1982)
 Kaakkum Kaamakakshi (1983)
 Kathula Poo (1984)
 Idhayam Thedum Udhayam (1984)
 Muthal Mariyathai (1985)
 Karimedu Karuvayan (1986)
 Meendum Mahaan (1987)
 Penmani Aval Kanmani (1988)
 Kai Naattu (1988)
 Sakalakala Sammandhi (1989) as Durga
 Idhayathai Thirudathe (1989)
 Enga Annan Varattum (1989)
 Aadi Velli (1990)

Malayalam

 Oomakkuyil (1983)
 Mansoru Maha Samudram (1983) as Renuka
 Pinnilavu (1983) as Gopi's wife
 Sreekrishna Parunth (1984) as Naanikutty
 Nethavu (1984)
 Poomadhathe Pennu (1984) as Jaanu
 Veendum Chalikkunna Chakram (1984) as Meera
 Theere Pratheekshikkathe (1984) as Aruna
 Njan Piranna Nattil (1985) as Sudha
 Snehicha Kuttathinu (1985) as Sulochana
 Uyarum Njan Nadake (1985) as Lasitha
 Mulamoottil Adima (1985) as Sainaba
 Scene No. 7 (1985) as Nandini
 Ashtabandham (1986) as Ambika Antharjanam

Kannada
 Ondagi Balu (1986)
 Sowbhagya Lakshmi (1985)
  Paraajitha (1982)

References

External links

Aruna at MSI

Living people
Actresses in Malayalam cinema
Actresses in Tamil cinema
Indian film actresses
Actresses in Kannada cinema
Actresses in Telugu cinema
Actresses from Andhra Pradesh
20th-century Indian actresses
People from Palakollu
Year of birth missing (living people)